Red cloak may refer to:

 Red Cloak, an industrial area in Scotland
 The Red Cloak, a 1955 film
 Redcloak, a character in the webcomic The Order of the Stick
 Aka Manto, a Japanese urban legend about a spirit who wears a red cloak
 Red Cloak (DJ), a Brazilian DJ and music producer